.pdm is a filename extension for the following programs:

DeskMate
PowerDesigner
Visual Basic (classic)
PowerDEVS
Adobe PageMaker

See also 
PDM (disambiguation)